Andrei Marina is a Moldovan football player who currently is playing for FC Olimpia Bălți.

References
 http://moldova.sports.md/andrei_marina/stats/

1990 births
Living people
CSF Bălți players
Moldovan footballers
Association football midfielders